Li Xuepeng (born 18 September 1988) is a Chinese footballer who currently plays for Guangzhou Evergrande in the Chinese Super League.

Club career
Li Xuepeng started his football career when he was promoted to Dalian Shide's first team in the 2007 season. He made his debut for the club on 9 August 2007 in a 2–1 win against Qingdao Jonoon.  Li scored his first goal for the club on 4 November 2007 in a 1–1 draw against Hangzhou Greentown. This led to a loan to First Division League side Citizen during the end of the 2007 season, making his debut for the club 2 December 2007 in a 3–0 loss against Happy Valley. Li would return to Dalian at the start of the 2008 season and play a significantly larger role at Dalian in a very disappointing season which saw the club flirt with relegation. At the start of the 2009 season, he would become a vital member of the squad due to his versatility to play in either the midfield or the defense, aiding Dalian to a midtable finish. Li lost his starting role for the club in the 2012 season and only played in three matches the entire season. In January 2013, Li transferred to Dalian Aerbin after Dalian Shide dissolved in the offseason.

On 10 June 2014, Li transferred to fellow Chinese Super League side Guangzhou Evergrande along with his teammate Yu Hanchao. He made his debut for the club on 27 July 2014 in a 1–0 win against Henan Jianye, coming on as a substitute for Liu Jian in the 70th minute. He was excluded from Guangzhou's squad after 23 June 2016 when manager Luiz Felipe Scolari stated that he would never use Li again during a press conference. This led to speculation that Li was looking for a transfer away from Guangzhou by the Chinese media. After several weeks, Li made his return to the first team on 9 August 2016 in a 0–0 draw against Beijing Guoan after reconciliation with Scolari.

International career
Li made his debut for the Chinese national team on 4 June 2010 in a 1–0 win against France, coming on as a substitute for Du Wei. He would then be called up to the squad that participated in the 2011 AFC Asian Cup where he played in a 2–2 draw against Uzbekistan.

Personal life
Li Xuepeng is the son of former Chinese footballer Li Xicai.

Career statistics

Club statistics
.

International statistics

Honours

Club
Guangzhou Evergrande
Chinese Super League: 2014, 2015, 2016, 2017, 2019
AFC Champions League: 2015
Chinese FA Cup: 2016
Chinese FA Super Cup: 2016, 2017, 2018

Individual
Chinese Super League Team of the Year: 2018

References

External links 
 
 Player profile at Sodasoccer.com
 
 Player stats at Sohu.com
 Li Xuepeng at HKFA

1988 births
Living people
Chinese footballers
Footballers from Dalian
China international footballers
2011 AFC Asian Cup players
Dalian Shide F.C. players
Dalian Professional F.C. players
Guangzhou F.C. players
Chinese Super League players
Expatriate footballers in Hong Kong
Chinese expatriate sportspeople in Hong Kong
Citizen AA players
Association football defenders